Shokouh al-Saltaneh (19th-century) was a royal consort of shah Naser al-Din Shah Qajar of Persia (r. 1848–1896).

She was the mother of shah Mozaffar ad-Din Shah Qajar (r. 1848–1896).

References

19th-century births
19th-century deaths
19th-century Iranian women
Qajar royal consorts